Venkatagiri railway station (station code:VKI) is an Indian Railways station in Venkatagiri town of Andhra Pradesh. It lies on the Gudur–Katpadi branch line and is administered under Guntakal railway division of South Coast Railway zone.

Classification

Venkatagiri railway station is classified as a D–category station in the Guntakal railway division.

Venkatagiri railway station connects the new Nadikudi–Srikalahasti section with Gudur–Katpadi branch line.

References

Railway stations in Tirupati district
Guntakal railway division